David Frederick Ley  is a geographer and a professor emeritus at the University of British Columbia. Ley was born in Swansea, Wales, earned his B.A. at Oxford University, and his M.S. and Ph.D. at Pennsylvania State University. He is known for his substantial empirical and theoretical contributions to the field of social, cultural and urban geography.

Early life and education 

Born in Swansa, Wales, Ley attended the Windsor grammar school and then Jesus College at Oxford University, where he studied Geography and earned a bachelor's degree in 1968. During his undergraduate studies, he conducted a field study in the Weald of Sussex in southern England.

After graduation, Ley moved to the United States and studied at Pennsylvania State University. He began forming his critique of the quantitative, statistical and theoretical status quo within the field of Human Geography. Ley and others felt that the field was unable to address many social issues. He graduated with a PhD. in 1972; his doctoral dissertation, titled The Black Inner City as Frontier Outpost: Images and Behavior of a Philadelphia Neighborhood, was published in 1974 by the Association of American Geographers. This dissertation was one of the first studies to use an ethnographic approach.

Career 

Following his Ph.D., Ley taught at the Department of Geography at the University of British Columbia, where he served as department head between 2009 and 2011. He was the first Co-Director of the Vancouver Centre of the Canadian Metropolis project, created to research and advise on policy issues of immigration and integration.

Contributions to geography 

Ley is committed to theoretically informed and ethnographically grounded research, which can be seen in his Social Geography of the City. He sees the merging of quantitative statistics and ethnographic descriptions as necessary.

Humanistic geography 

Ley helped formulate a counter to positivism and structural Marxism in the form of humanistic geography. In 1976, Ley and Marywan Samuals published a volume of essays entitled Humanistic Geography.

Cultural turn 

During the 1980s, human and social geography underwent a "cultural turn". Ley’s 1988 editorial, co-authored with Derek Gregory, outlined the potential he saw in a cultural perspective to the field.

Gentrification 

During the 1980s, Ley began to research gentrification. Ley’s 1990s book The New Middle Class and the Remaking of the Central City, described patterns of urban gentrification in six Canadian cities outlines a demand-side explanation to gentrification, as opposed to Smith’s Marxist supply-side hypothesis. Ley "followed the hippies" who were in line with his humanistic approach to geography.

Transnationalism and the Metropolis project 

Ley became the first co-director of Vancouver Centre of the Canadian Metropolis Project, a group of academics, policy makers and migrant service providers working to develop policy solutions to rising foreign immigration in Canadian urban centers. Ley has since contributed to research on the effects of immigration and urbanization. His later book titled Millionaire Migrants: Trans-Pacific Life Lines looks at wealthy east Asian immigration, and the effects these migrants have had on the cultural and economical landscape of North American, Australian and New Zealand cities.

Recognition 

 Fellow of Royal Society of Canada.
 Canada Research Chair in Urbanization and Cultural Diversity.
 Pierre Trudeau Fellow 2003.
 Lifetime Achievement Award by the Association of American Geographers in 2009.
 Massey Medal 2013
 Order of Canada (Officer) 2022

Bibliography

Books 

 Ley, D., in preparation. Millionaire Migrants: Trans-Pacific Life Lines.
 
 Hasson, S. and D. Ley,  1994.  Neighbourhood Organisations and the Welfare State.  Toronto:  University of Toronto Press,  387 pp.
 Duncan, J. and D. Ley  (eds.),  1993. Place/Culture/Representation.  London and New York:  Routledge,  341 pp.
 Bourne, L. and D. Ley  (eds.),  1993.  The Changing Social Geography of Canadian Cities.  Montreal:  McGill-Queens Press,  487 pp.
 Clarke, C., D. Ley and C. Peach  (eds.),  1984.  Geography and Ethnic Pluralism.  London and Boston:  Allen and Unwin,  294 pp.  (Spanish edition,  1987).
 Ley, D.,  1983.  A Social Geography of the City.  New York and London:  Harper and Row,  449 pp.
 Ley, D. and M. Samuels  (eds.),  1978.  Humanistic Geography.  Chicago:  Maaroufa/Methuen,  London:  Croom Helm,  337 pp.
 Ley, D.  (ed.),  1974.  Community Participation and the Spatial Order of the City.  Vancouver,  BC:  Tantalus Publications,  126 pp.
 Ley, D., 1974.  The Black Inner City as Frontier Outpost:  Images and Behaviour of a  Philadelphia Neighbourhood. Washington,  DC:  Association of American Geographers,  Monograph Series No. 7,  282 pp.

See also 

 Social geography
 Human geography
 Urban geography

References

External links 

 
 David Ley - Canada Research Chair
 David Ley - List of publications

Welsh geographers
Canadian geographers
Social geographers
Academic staff of the University of British Columbia
Fellows of the Royal Society of Canada
Living people
Massey Medal recipients
Year of birth missing (living people)
Officers of the Order of Canada
Welsh emigrants to Canada